is a Japanese professional wrestler better known by his ring name SB Kento (often stylized in capital letters as SB KENTo) currently working for the Japanese promotion Dragon Gate where he is the former Open the Brave Gate Champion in his second reign and the former Open the Twin Gate Champion in his first reign.

Professional wrestling career

Dragon Gate (2019–present) 
Kobune made his professional wrestling debut at Dragon Gate PRIME ZONE Vol. 76 on April 16, 2019, where he went into a time-limit draw against Taketo Kamei in an exhibition match. He made his first appearance in an official match hosted by the promotion at Fantastic Gate 2019 on December 22 where he teamed up with Naruki Doi to defeat Taketo Kamei and Yamato. 

At the DG Truth Gate 2021 on February 26, Kobune participated in a 12-man Royal Sambo battle royal also involving the winner Stalker Ichikawa, Super Shisa, Yasushi Kanda, Yosuke Santa Maria and others. On the evening show of the eleventh night of the 2021 Open The New Year Gate on January 31, he teamed up with fellow R.E.D. stablemates BxB Hulk, Kaito Ishida and HipHop Kikuta to defeat  Masquerade (Jason Lee, Kota Minoura, La Estrella and Shun Skywalker) in an eight-man tag team match. At The Gate Of Adventure 2021 on August 8, Kobune defeated Kagetora to win the Open the Brave Gate Championship.

Kobune is known for his work towards various signature events of the promotion. One of them is the Gate of Destiny, making his first appearance at the 2020 edition on November 3, where he teamed up with Madoka Kikuta and Taketo Kamei to defeat Team Toryumon (Masato Yoshino, Último Dragón and Yasushi Kanda) in a six-man tag team match. Kobune won the Open the Triangle Gate Championship by teaming up with Kazma Sakamoto and Takashi Yoshida the same night as they defeated Naruki Doi, Punch Tominaga and Ryotsu Shimizu to win the vacant titles. It was later revealed that Kobune, Sakamoto and Yoshida have joined the R.E.D. stable and went as a sub-group ever since.

Another event in which he participated was the King of Gate 2021 where he placed himself in the Block B which he won by scoring a total of six points after competing against Dragon Kid, Eita, Jason Lee, Susumu Yokosuka and Kzy. He then fell short to Kzy in the semi-finals after the latter won a second chance battle royal.

Championships and accomplishments
Dragon Gate
Open the Brave Gate Championship (2 times)
Open the Twin Gate Championship (1 time) – with H.Y.O
Open the Triangle Gate Championship (1 time) – with Kazma Sakamoto and Takashi Yoshida
Pro Wrestling Illustrated
Ranked No. 145 of the top 500 singles wrestlers in the PWI 500 in 2022

Luchas de Apuestas record

References

External links 
 

2000 births
Living people
Japanese male professional wrestlers
People from Aichi Prefecture
21st-century professional wrestlers
Open the Brave Gate Champions
Open the Twin Gate Champions
Open the Triangle Gate Champions